Haihui Temple is a Buddhist temple located in Lianxi District, Jiujiang, Jiangxi, China.

History
Haihui Temple was originally built in 1618 by Chan master Shi Xilai, during the Ming dynasty (1368–1644). The temple was refurbished by Shi Danyun in 1817, in Jiaqing Emperor's reign of the Qing dynasty (1644–1911). In 1853, the temple was completely destroyed in the Taiping Rebellion. In 1866, Shi Haiyin raised funds to restore Haihui Temple.

In the summer of 1938, when the Imperial Japanese Army attacked Mount Lu, Haihui Temple was bombed into ruins. After the Second Sino-Japanese War, the temple was rebuilt by monks, but the scale was not as magnificent and elegant as before.

After the establishment of the Communist State in 1949, the temple was used as the Lushan Branch of Communist Labor University.

Architecture
Haihui Temple is backed by Wulao Peak and faces Poyang Lake.

References

Buddhist temples in Jiangxi
Buildings and structures in Jiujiang
Tourist attractions in Jiujiang
20th-century establishments in China
20th-century Buddhist temples